Weerselo is a village in the Dutch province of Overijssel. It is a part of the municipality of Dinkelland, and lies about 6 km northwest of Oldenzaal. Weerselo was a separate municipality until 2001 when it became a part of Dinkelland.

Overview 
It was first mentioned in the 1160s as Werslo. The etymology is unclear. It consists of two settlements. Het Stift developed around a 12th century Benedictine monastery, and the village of Weerselo which was also called Nijstad. The monastery burnt down in 1523. In 1840, it was home to 558 people.

A fine example of the historic building style in Twente, in the east of the Netherlands, can be found near the Stiftskerk, which in itself is a point of interest in this village, since it is its oldest core that gave name to the village.

The 'Weerselose Markt' is a flea market for antiques and bric-à-brac which opens every Saturday.

Notable people 
 Felix von Heijden (1890–1982), football player who competed in the 1920 Summer Olympics
 Jos Lansink (born 1961), equestrian
 Elles Leferink (born 1976), volleyball player who competed in the 1996 Summer Olympics
 André Paus (born 1965), football player and manager

Gallery

References

Municipalities of the Netherlands disestablished in 2001
Populated places in Overijssel
Former municipalities of Overijssel
Twente
Dinkelland